WGPL is a Black Gospel formatted broadcast radio station licensed to Portsmouth, Virginia, serving Hampton Roads.  WGPL is owned and operated by Friendship Cathederal Family Worship Center, Inc.

The station began broadcasting as WSAP in February 1943 as a Mutual affiliate. It operated on 1490 kHz with 250 watts of power from 6 a.m. to 2 a.m.  As WAVY, the station competed against cross-town WGH with a top 40 music format until 1962. In the early 1970s the station competed against WGH/1310 and WNOR/1230 with a Top 40 format as WCVU and WKLX.

References

External links

1942 establishments in Virginia
Gospel radio stations in the United States
Radio stations established in 1942
GPL
GPL